Carmelo Ambrosio Robledo (July 13, 1912 – c. 1981) was an Argentine boxer who competed in the 1928 Summer Olympics and in the 1932 Summer Olympics.

In 1928 he was eliminated in the quarterfinals of the bantamweight competition.

Four years later he won the gold medal in the featherweight class after winning the final against Josef Schleinkofer of Germany.

1928 Olympic Results
Carmelo Robledo competed as a bantamweight for Argentina at the 1928 Olympic boxing tournament in Amsterdam.  Here are his results:

 Round of 32: bye
 Round of 16: defeated Emiel Van Rumbecke of Belgium by decision
 Quarterfinal: lost to Frank Taylor of Ireland by decision

1932 Olympic Results
Carmelo Robledo competed as a featherweight for Argentina at the 1932 Olympic boxing tournament in Los Angeles.  Here are his results:

 Round of 16: bye
 Quarterfinal: defeated Ernest Smith of Ireland by decision
 Semifinal: defeated Allan Carlsson of Sweden by decision
 Final: defeated Josef Schleinkofer of Germany by decision (won gold medal)

References

 Un repaso de la historia, revista El Gráfico, 2008 (in Spanish).
 Las Medallas Argentinas en los Juegos Olímpicos (por juego), Secretaría de Deporte de la Nación Argentina (in Spanish).

1912 births
1980s deaths

Bantamweight boxers
Boxers at the 1928 Summer Olympics
Boxers at the 1932 Summer Olympics
Featherweight boxers
Olympic boxers of Argentina
Olympic gold medalists for Argentina
Olympic medalists in boxing
Argentine male boxers
Medalists at the 1932 Summer Olympics